Klaus-Peter Willsch (28 February 1961, Bad Schwalbach) is a German politician of the CDU party and member of the Bundestag, representing Rheingau-Taunus – Limburg.

Early life and education
Willsch attended the University of Mainz and received a master's degree in Economics and Political science. He served in the military service and began his career at Flughafen Frankfurt/Main AG.

Political career
After joining the CDU, Willsch started his political career. In 1994, he was mayor of Schlangenbad. From 2000, he is a representative of CDU in Hesse.

Willsch has been a member of the German Bundestag since the 1998 elections. In parliament, he first served on the Finance Committee from 1998 until 2002. He was a member of the Budget Committee between 2002 and 2013. Since 2013, he has been serving on the Committee on Economic Affairs and Energy. In this capacity, he is his parliamentary group's rapporteur on aviation and arms exports.

In addition to his committee assignments, Willsch chaired the German-Croatian Parliamentary Friendship Group between 2006 and 2010; he has been serving as deputy chairman ever since. Since 2014, he has been chairing the Berlin-Taipei Parliamentary Circle of Friends.

Other activities

Corporate boards
 go4copy.net eG, Member of the Supervisory Board

Non-profit organizations
 Association of German Foundations, Member of the Parliamentary Advisory Board
 Fraunhofer Institute for Production Systems and Design Technology (IPK), Member of the Board of Trustees (since 2012)
 Vietnamese-German University (VGU), Member of the Board of Trustees (since 2011)
 Berlin Social Science Center (WZB), Member of the Board of Trustees (since 2006)
 Fraunhofer Society, Member of the Senate (2005-2010)

Political positions
Within his party, Willsch is widely regarded a critic of chairwoman and Chancellor Angela Merkel. On 17 July 2015 he voted against the government's proposal to negotiate a third bailout for Greece. In June 2017, he voted against Germany's introduction of same-sex marriage. On 16 March 2018, he was one of three CDU members who broke ranks with their parliamentary group in not voting against a motion of the Alternative for Germany; instead they decided to abstain from the vote.

Ahead of the Christian Democrats’ leadership election in 2018, Willsch publicly endorsed Friedrich Merz to succeed Angela Merkel as the party's chair. In early 2020, he co-founded an informal cross-party group of MPs from the CDU, CSU and FDP parties who opposed a potential coalition government between CDU/CSU and the Green Party.

Personal life
Willsch is married and has five children. The family resides in Holzhausen (which is called Holdesse in the local dialect), a town in Rheingau-Taunus-Kreis.

References

External links
Article in the Bundestag

1961 births
Living people
Members of the Bundestag for Hesse
Johannes Gutenberg University Mainz alumni
Members of the Bundestag 2013–2017
Members of the Bundestag 2021–2025
Members of the Bundestag 2017–2021
Members of the Bundestag 2009–2013
Members of the Bundestag 2005–2009
Members of the Bundestag 2002–2005
Members of the Bundestag 1998–2002
Members of the Bundestag for the Christian Democratic Union of Germany